The following highways are numbered 971:

United States